Sydney Metropolitan Wildlife Services, Inc (SMWS) is an organisation that is dedicated to caring for Sydney's sick, injured or orphaned native fauna. Members are licensed by the National Parks and Wildlife Service under the National Parks and Wildlife Act, 1974. The head office of SMWS is in the Lane Cove National Park and offers 24-hour rescue service.

Duties 
Wildlife Conservation
Wildlife Rescue and Rehabilitation
Wildlife Training
Public education about wildlife matters.
Assistance to the New South Wales Rural Fire Service

External links
 Sydney Wildlife

Wildlife rehabilitation and conservation centers